Sueca is a city in eastern Spain in the Valencian Community. It is situated on the left bank of the river Xúquer. The town of Sueca is separated from the Mediterranean Sea  to the east by the Serra de Cullera, though the municipality possesses  of Mediterranean coastline. Some of the architecture shows Moorish roots—the flat roofs, view-turrets (miradors), and horseshoe arches—and the area has an irrigation system dating from Moorish times. Rice processing is the principal industry, though oranges are also exported.

Villages included in the municipality
 Mareny de Barraquetes

Twin Towns
 Évreux, France
 Palafrugell, Spain

References

External links
Map and pictures of Sueca

Municipalities in the Province of Valencia
Ribera Baixa